

List of representatives
Zenko Suzuki, 1947・1949・1952・1953・1955・1958・1960・1963・1967・1969・1972・1976・1979・1980・1983・1986
Kentaro Kudo, New Life Party, 1993

Election results
1993 Japanese general election
Kentaro Kudo, New Life Party, 73,452 votes
1986 Japanese general election
Zenko Suzuki
1983 Japanese general election
Zenko Suzuki
1980 Japanese general election
Zenko Suzuki
1979 Japanese general election
Zenko Suzuki
1976 Japanese general election
Zenko Suzuki
1972 Japanese general election
Zenko Suzuki
1969 Japanese general election
Zenko Suzuki
1967 Japanese general election
Zenko Suzuki
1963 Japanese general election
Zenko Suzuki
1960 Japanese general election
Zenko Suzuki
1958 Japanese general election
Zenko Suzuki
1955 Japanese general election
Zenko Suzuki
1953 Japanese general election
Zenko Suzuki
1952 Japanese general election
Zenko Suzuki
1949 Japanese general election
Zenko Suzuki
1947 Japanese general election
Zenko Suzuki

Politics of Iwate Prefecture
Districts of the House of Representatives (Japan)